Jaime Washington Galarza Delgado (born 7 November 1934) is an Ecuadorian footballer. He played in five matches for the Ecuador national football team in 1963. He was also part of Ecuador's squad for the 1963 South American Championship.

References

1934 births
Living people
Ecuadorian footballers
Ecuador international footballers
Association football defenders
Sportspeople from Guayaquil